The Maia were an indigenous Australian tribe of Western Australia.

Language
The Maia appear to have spoken a dialect similar to that of the Yingkarta.

Country
Maia traditional lands extended over an estimated . They consisted mainly of a strip on the coast facing the Indian Ocean, and a western hinterland and up to and beyond Boolathanna, Mooka, Mardathuna, Binthalya, and the Kennedy Range. They also lived around the coastal salt lakes near Canarvon to Manberry and Hutton Creek. Their southern flank ran down to the floodplain of the Gascoyne River, and on Lake Macleod.

History of contact
The Maia are believed to have been extinct by 1910. Their area was afflicted by diseases like smallpox and influenza which ravaged the coastal populations after the establishment of pearling stations on the coast, at Shark Bay and Cossack. Subsequently, 'nigger hunting' to cull hands to work the pearling trawlers, and a system of indentured labour imposed on the tribes found by pastoralists on their runs, effectively decimated people like the Maia by breaking up their kinship groups.

Alternative names
 Majanna (nggarda exonym)
 Miah

Source:

Some words
 baba (1.breasts; 2.rain; 3.water)
 doodoota (wild dog)
 mamma (father)
 manghana (tame dog)
 marawa  (whiteman)
 ngangerreta (mother)
 yamba (baby)

Source:

Notes

Citations

Sources

Aboriginal peoples of Western Australia